Sir Wilfred William Hill Hill-Wood  (8 September 1901 – 10 October 1980) was an English financier and cricketer who played first-class cricket for Derbyshire between 1919 and 1936, as well as for Cambridge University and Marylebone Cricket Club (MCC).

Early life
Hill-Wood was the second son of Sir Samuel Hill-Wood, 1st Baronet, and his wife Hon. Rachel Bateman-Hanbury. His father was a Member of Parliament and had also played cricket for Derbyshire. He was educated at Ludgrove and Eton, where he played for the first XI, appearing in the Eton-Harrow match in 1918, 1919 and 1920. He then went to Trinity College, Cambridge.

Cricketing career
Hill-Wood made his debut for Derbyshire in the 1919 season when he took 2 wickets and scored a total of 49 in two innings against Northamptonshire. He played two more games in 1919 and next played one game for Derbyshire in the 1921 season. In 1921 and 1922 he was playing for Cambridge University. He took part in a Marylebone Cricket Club (MCC) tour of New Zealand in 1922/23 and was a regular in the Derbyshire side in the 1923 season. He played two matches for Derbyshire in the 1924 season and five for them in the 1925 season in which years he also played for the Eton Ramblers. In 1932/33 he played during a tour of India, and performed again for Derbyshire in the 1935 and 1936 seasons. His last matches were in 1938 and 1939 for the MCC against the universities. Hill-Wood was a right hand batsman and played 60 innings for Derbyshire in 35 matches. His top score was 107 and his average 25.74. He played 21 innings in 14 matches for Cambridge University with a top score of 81. He was a leg-break bowler and took 49 wickets at an average 31.08 for Derbyshire. He took 14 wickets at an average of 28.85 for Cambridge University. His best overall match count was 5 for 62.

Financial career
Hill-Wood was Managing Director of Morgan, Grenfell & Co. 1939–67, and during the Second World War was with the British Purchasing Commission. He was Chairman of Eversholt Estate Development and Vice-President of St Pancras Housing Association.

He was made a Commander of the Order of the British Empire in 1946 for his work as Director, Western Area, Postal and Telegraph Censorship Department. He was a personal friend of King George VI and advised the royal family on financial affairs. He was knighted in 1976 as a Knight Commander of the Royal Victorian Order, an order in the personal gift of The Queen.

Family
As well as his father, Hill-Wood's brothers Basil, Denis and Charles played cricket for Derbyshire.

References

1901 births
1980 deaths
Cambridge University cricketers
Commanders of the Order of the British Empire
Derbyshire cricketers
English cricketers
Knights Commander of the Royal Victorian Order
Marylebone Cricket Club cricketers
People educated at Eton College
Alumni of Trinity College, Cambridge
English cricketers of 1919 to 1945
Younger sons of baronets
Viceroy's XI cricketers
People educated at Ludgrove School